Anabarilius macrolepis is an extinct species of ray-finned fish in the family Cyprinidae that was endemic to Yilong Lake in Yunnan, China. It is believed that it became extinct when Yilong Lake dried up in 1981, as a result of water abstraction for agriculture. The species was not observed in 1983–84, and was declared extinct in 2011.

References

macrolepis
Freshwater fish of China
Endemic fauna of Yunnan
Extinct animals of Asia
Fish described in 1964
Fish extinctions since 1500